Mushuc Runa Sporting Club is an Ecuadorian football club based in Ambato, Ecuador. It was founded on January 2, 2003. They currently play in the Ecuadorian Serie A. The club was established on January 2, 2003. Etymologically, the name comes from the Quechuan language where "Mushuc" means new, and "Runa" means man, person, or human being; therefore, the literal translation is "New Man".

Honours
Serie B
Winner (1): 2018
Runner-up (1): 2013
Segunda Categoría
Runner-up (1): 2011

Current squad
As of 5 March 2022.

Managers
 César Vigevani (Dec 13, 2012 – April 1, 2014)
 Fabián Burbano (interim) (April 1, 2014 – April 6, 2014)
 Julio Asad (April 4, 2014 - March 30, 2015)
 Sixto Vizuete (March 31, 2015 - December 13, 2015)
 Humberto Pizarro (December 15, 2015 - April 16, 2016)
 Néstor Clausen (April 16, 2016 - July 7, 2016)
 Víctor Hugo Andrada (July 20, 2016 - October 31, 2016)
 Luis Espinel (December 30, 2016 - June 11, 2017)
 Juan Carlos Garay (June 11, 2017 - November 6, 2017)
 Hector Chacha (interim) (November 7, 2017 - December 19, 2017)
 Geovanny Cumbicus (December 19, 2017 - May 29, 2019)
 Martín Cardetti (May 31, 2019 - November 11, 2019)
 Ricardo Dillon (November 12, 2019 - December 19, 2020)
 Geovanny Cumbicus (December 24, 2020 -

External links
 Official website

Football clubs in Ecuador
Association football clubs established in 2003
2003 establishments in Ecuador
Ambato, Ecuador
Mushuc Runa S.C.